Antoine-Denis Raudot (1679 in Versailles, France – 28 July 1737).

He was the co-intendant of New France from 1705 to 1710, along with Jacques Raudot, his father.

Raudot's term as intendant of New France was the beginning of a long and distinguished career. It allowed him to demonstrate his ability in development of economic models that would work in an emerging market.

External links 

 Raudot, Antoine-Denis biography at the Dictionary of Canadian Biography Online
 Antoine-Denis Raudot at The Canadian Encyclopedia

1679 births
1737 deaths
Intendants of New France